The Perfect Woman may refer to:

 The Perfect Woman (1920 film), an American silent comedy starring Constance Talmadge
 The Perfect Woman (1949 film), a British comedy starring Patricia Roc
 La mujer perfecta, a Venezuelan telenovela whose English title is The Perfect Woman